Lauren Milliet (born December 1, 1996) is an American soccer midfielder who plays for Racing Louisville of the National Women's Soccer League (NWSL).

Club career

North Carolina Courage
Milliet was chosen by the North Carolina Courage in the second round with the 14th overall pick in the 2019 NWSL College Draft.

Racing Louisville FC
Milliet was chosen by Racing Louisville FC in the 2020 NWSL Expansion Draft. She has appeared in every Racing match since joining the club, scoring her first goal for the team in a 3-0 win over the Kansas City Current on April 2 in the NWSL Challenge Cup.

College career 
Milliet started in all 77 of her appearances for Colorado College, tallying 21 goals and 16 assists. The midfielder was the 14th overall pick in the 2019 NWSL draft as just the second player to be selected from Colorado College.

References

External links
 
 North Carolina Courage profile
 2015 Summer Universiade profile

1996 births
American women's soccer players
Living people
National Women's Soccer League players
North Carolina Courage players
Racing Louisville FC players
People from Durango, Colorado
Soccer players from Colorado
Women's association football midfielders
North Carolina Courage draft picks
Colorado College Tigers women's soccer players